Oakland is a city located along the West Nishnabotna River in Pottawattamie County, Iowa, United States. The population was 1,524 at the time of the 2020 census. Formerly named Big Grove, Oakland is home to Nishna Heritage Museum and a number of historical buildings.

History
Oakland began in 1880 with the construction of the Chicago, Rock Island and Pacific Railroad through the territory.

Geography
Oakland is located at  (41.308492, -95.395565).

Climate

Demographics

2010 census
As of the 2010 census, there were 1,527 people, 604 households, and 407 families living in the city. The racial makeup of the city was 96.7% White, 0.5% African American, 0.2% Native American, 1.5% from other races, and 1.2% from two or more races. Hispanic or Latino of any race were 4.3% of the population.

There were 604 households, of which 32.3% had children under the age of 18 living with them, 53.3% were married couples living together, 10.3% had a female householder with no husband present, 3.8% had a male householder with no wife present, and 32.6% were non-families. 28.6% of all households were made up of individuals, and 13.4% had someone living alone who was 65 years of age or older. The average household size was 2.44 and the average family size was 3.00.

The median age in the city was 39.8 years. 24.8% of residents were under the age of 18; 6.5% were between the ages of 18 and 24; 24.2% were from 25 to 44; 26.5% were from 45 to 64; and 18.2% were 65 years of age or older. The gender makeup of the city was 47.1% male and 52.9% female.

2000 census
As of the 2000 census, there were 1,487 people, 600 households, and 397 families living in the city. The racial makeup of the city was 98.45% White, 0.54% African American, 0.34% Native American, 0.13% Asian, and 0.54% from two or more races. Hispanic or Latino of any race were 0.27% of the population.

There were 600 households, of which 29.8% had children under the age of 18 living with them, 55.8% were married couples living together, 7.8% had a female householder with no husband present, and 33.8% were non-families. 30.5% of all households were made up of individuals, and 16.2% had someone living alone who was 65 years of age or older. The average household size was 2.37 and the average family size was 2.91.

24.3% of the population were under the age of 18, 7.6% from 18 to 24, 24.9% from 25 to 44, 21.5% from 45 to 64, and 21.7% who were 65 years of age or older. The median age was 40 years. For every 100 females, there were 91.4 males. For every 100 females age 18 and over, there were 86.0 males.

The median household income was $37,961 and the median family income was $48,092. Males had a median income of $31,569 and females $22,902. The per capita income was $19,205. About 4.8% of families and 6.1% of the population were below the poverty line, including 5.8% of those under age 18 and 6.4% of those age 65 or over.

Education
Oakland is within the Riverside Community School District. The district formed on July 1, 1993 with the merger of the Carson-Macedonia and Oakland districts.

Notable people 

Pat Bohen, professional baseball player
Frank Tenney Johnson, painter

References

Cities in Pottawattamie County, Iowa
Cities in Iowa